Bruen Stapleford is a former civil parish, now in the parish of Tarvin in the unitary authority of Cheshire West and Chester and the ceremonial county of Cheshire, England.  According to the 2001 census it had a population of 66, rising to 186 at the 2011 Census. The civil parish was abolished in 2015 and merged into Tarvin.

History
A prehistoric settlement of six roundhouses has been excavated near Brook House Farm. It was occupied from the Middle Bronze Age to the end of the Iron Age (approximately 1000 BC to 42 AD).

See also

Listed buildings in Bruen Stapleford

References

External links

Former civil parishes in Cheshire
Cheshire West and Chester